The following are the national records in Olympic weightlifting in Ghana. Records are maintained in each weight class for the snatch lift, clean and jerk lift, and the total for both lifts by the National Sport Council, Ghana Weightlifting Federation.

Current records

Men

Women

References

Ghana
weightlifting